is a Japanese rugby sevens player. He was selected for 's sevens team to the 2016 Summer Olympics.

References

External links
 
 JRFU Player Profile

1989 births
Living people
People from Tokyo
Sportspeople from Tokyo
Male rugby sevens players
Rugby sevens players at the 2016 Summer Olympics
Olympic rugby sevens players of Japan
Japanese rugby sevens players
Japanese rugby union players
Japan international rugby union players
Toshiba Brave Lupus Tokyo players
Japan international rugby sevens players
Rugby union wings
Rugby union fullbacks